Palai is an administrative unit, known as Union council, of Malakand District in the Khyber Pakhtunkhwa province of Pakistan. It is renowned for its blood-red oranges due to the rich and well-drained soil found there.

Palai is also said to be the birthplace of Pushto folktale characters Adam Khan and Durkhani.

Villages 
Palai Dara includes the villages Ziarat, Zormadai, Sher Khana, Koza Bazdara,Mora Banda and Bara Bazdara. 

Adam Khan was born in Koza Bazdara, while Durkhani hailed from Bara Bazdara. Palai Dara has produced several poets including Anwar Hussain, Khaliq Dad Omeed, and Asfandyar Zia.

Orchards 
Palai and its surrounding villages in the Malakand district are famous for their fine-quality produce. This includes fruits such as peaches, guavas, and the Palai red blood oranges amongst many other citrus fruits. The area is home to approximately 171,000 fruit-bearing trees; playing a vital role in the purification of the air and acting as a habitat to countless species of both flora and fauna.

Besides that, the orchards of the area attract tens of thousands of bees during the flowering season every year, serving as a homestead to the honey-making business. In the past few years, the area has observed an exponential increase in the number of trees and orchards, because of the government's arrangement of the water canal.

The construction of Swat Expressway (especially Palai Interchange) is supposed to take the area's agriculture and apiculture industries to a whole new level because, for the first time in history, the producers will get an opportunity to showcase their products in bigger markets; both nationally and internationally.

See also 

Malakand District

References

External links
Khyber-Pakhtunkhwa Government website section on Lower Dir
United Nations
Hajjinfo.org Uploads
PBS paiman.jsi.com

Malakand District
Populated places in Malakand District
Union councils of Khyber Pakhtunkhwa
Union Councils of Malakand District